As a general term in theological use, assurance refers to a believer's confidence in God, God's response to prayer, and the hope of eternal salvation. In Protestant Christian doctrine, the term "assurance", also known as the Witness of the Spirit, affirms that the inner witness of the Holy Spirit allows the Christian disciple to know that he or she is justified.  Based on the writings of St. Augustine of Hippo, assurance was historically a very important doctrine in Lutheranism and Calvinism, and remains a distinguishing doctrine of Methodism and Quakerism, although there are differences among these Christian traditions. Hymns that celebrate the witness of the Holy Spirit, such as "Blessed Assurance" are sung in Christian liturgies to celebrate the belief in assurance.

John Wesley and Methodism
John Wesley believed that all Christians have a faith which implies an assurance of God's forgiving love, and that one would feel that assurance, or the "witness of the Spirit". This understanding is grounded in Paul's affirmation, "...ye have received the Spirit of adoption, whereby we cry Abba, Father. The same Spirit beareth witness with our spirits, that we are the children of God..." (Romans 8:15-16, Wesley's translation). This experience was mirrored for Wesley in his Aldersgate experience wherein he "knew" he was loved by God and that his sins were forgiven.

"I felt my heart strangely warmed. I felt I did trust in Christ, Christ alone for salvation, and an assurance was given me that He had taken my sin, even mine." — from Wesley's Journal.

Early in his ministry Wesley had to defend his understanding of assurance. In 1738, Arthur Bedford had published a sermon in which he misquoted Wesley's teachings. Bedford had misunderstood Wesley as saying that a Christian could be assured of persevering in a state of salvation, the Reformed view.

In a letter dated September 28, 1738, Wesley wrote, "The assurance of which I alone speak I should not choose to call an assurance of salvation, but rather (with the Scriptures), the assurance of faith. . . . [This] is not the essence of faith, but a distinct gift of the Holy Ghost, whereby God shines upon his own work, and shows us that we are justified through faith in Christ...The 'full assurance of faith' (Hebrews 10.22) is 'neither more nor less than hope; or a conviction, wrought in us by the Holy Ghost, that we have a measure of the true faith in Christ..'"

The full assurance of faith taught by Methodists is the Holy Spirit's witness to a person who has been regenerated and entirely sanctified. He that feareth is not made perfect in love." (KJV) John Wesley emphasized that this is not an assurance about the future, but about the present state of the believer (Methodist theology teaches that apostasy can occur through sin or a loss of faith). Believers can be assured that they are the adopted children of God and will be with Him for eternity if they continue in holiness by trusting in Christ and obeying God's commandments in this life.

The Pilgrim Nazarene Church, a Methodist denomination in the conservative holiness tradition, thus teaches:

The Emmanuel Association of Churches, another Methodist denomination, states:

Quakerism
The Central Yearly Meeting of Friends, a Holiness Quaker denomination, teaches in reference to the experiences of the New Birth and Perfection "that the Spirit of God gives to each born again person an inward witness that he is truly a child of God and to each truly sanctified person a witness that he is entirely sanctified." Quakers hold that the "witness of the Spirit is nothing more than the communication and assurance of God through the Spirit to the inward consciousness of the seeking and the believing soul that he has received that which he desired of God, that God has both hear the prayer and performed His work of grace in the heart (Rom 8;16; I Jn. 5:14, 15)."

Baptists
Baptists teach that a "person is born again when he/she  believes on the gospel of the Lord Jesus Christ (the death, burial, and resurrection) and he/she calls upon the name of the Lord. " Those who have been born again, according to Baptist teaching, know that they are "a child of God because the Holy Spirit witnesses to them that they are."

Lutheranism

Lutheranism accepts monergism, which states that salvation is by God's act alone, and rejects the teaching that humans in their fallen state have a free will concerning spiritual matters. Lutherans believe that although humans have free will concerning civil righteousness, they cannot work spiritual righteousness without the Holy Spirit, since righteousness in the heart cannot be wrought in the absence of the Holy Spirit. Lutherans believe that the elect are predestined to salvation. According to Lutheranism, Christians should be assured that they are among the predestined. Lutherans believe that all who trust in Jesus alone can be certain of their salvation, for it is in Christ's work and his promises in which their certainty lies. However, they disagree with those that make predestination the source of salvation rather than Christ's suffering, death, and resurrection. Unlike Calvinists, Lutherans do not believe in a predestination to damnation. Instead, Lutherans teach eternal damnation is a result of the unbeliever's sins, rejection of the forgiveness of sins, and unbelief, all of which occur when God chooses not to positively intervene during the unbeliever's lifetime. The central final hope of the Christian is "the resurrection of the body and the life everlasting" as confessed in the Apostles' Creed, but Lutherans also teach that, at death, Christian souls are immediately taken into the presence of Jesus in heaven, where they await this bodily resurrection and the second coming of Jesus on the Last Day.

Reformed

Reformed Christianity (Calvinism) has had controversies over the doctrine of assurance, many however teach that believers may have assurance of their salvation especially through the work of the Holy Spirit and also by looking at the character of their lives. The idea that because good works necessarily result from true faith one can gain assurance by observing evidences of faith in their life is called the practical syllogism. T If they believe God's promises and seek to live in accord with God's commands, then their good deeds done in response with a cheerful heart provide proof that ca strengthen their assurance of salvation against doubts. This assurance is not, however, a necessary consequence of salvation, and such assurance may be shaken as well as strengthened.

The Westminster Confession of Faith affirms that assurance is attainable though the wait for it may be long:

...infallible assurance doth not so belong to the essence of faith but that a true believer may wait long and conflict with many difficulties before he be partaker of it: yet, being enabled by the Spirit to know the things which are freely given him of God, he may, without extraordinary revelation, in the right use of ordinary means, attain thereunto. And therefore it is the duty of everyone to give all diligence to make his calling and election sure; that thereby his heart may be enlarged in peace and joy in the Holy Ghost, in love and thankfulness to God, and in strength and cheerfulness in the duties of obedience, the proper fruits of this assurance... 

Additionally, the Augustinian doctrines of grace regarding predestination are taught in the Reformed churches primarily to assure believers of their salvation since the Calvinist doctrines emphasize that salvation is entirely a sovereign gift of God apart from the recipient's choice, deeds, or feelings (compare perseverance of the saints).

The Marrow Brethren, being a group inside Reformed theology instead taught that assurance is to be grounded upon the gospel, while their opponents emphasized the human element in assurance.

Anabaptism
Anabaptists who belong to Conservative Mennonite and New Order Amish communities teach the belief in assurance—"that one can know the state of his soul while on earth". This differs from the Old Order Amish understanding, who teach a "living hope" of salvation. Obedience to Jesus and a careful keeping of the Ten Commandments, in addition to loving one another and being at peace with others are seen as "earmarks of the saved".

Similarities in Catholic teaching

The Catholic Church teaches that an infallible certitude of final salvation, as supposed in Calvinism, is not a usual experience, as seen in the sixteenth canon of the sixth session of the Council of Trent:

"If any one saith, that he will for certain, of an absolute and infallible certainty, have that great gift of perseverance unto the end, unless he have learned this by special revelation; let him be anathema."
 
In critiquing the Reformed doctrine of the assurance of salvation, prominent Catholic apologist Robert Sungenis notes a complication of the doctrine as it relates to the historic Protestant doctrine of Sola fide:

Catholics recognize that a certainty of faith is ascribed to St. Paul (2 Cor 12,9) and speculate that the Virgin Mary also probably possessed it. Jesus Christ as man, however, did not need to believe since he knew it. Ludwig Ott argues that a high moral, human certainty of having sanctifying grace is possible, on the grounds that one is not conscious of an unforgiven grave sin, but by no means faith which is believing with divine certainty and that with some probability one can locate positive signs of predestination, which does not mean that their lack be a sign of reprobation: He lists persistent action of the virtues recommended in the Eight Beatitudes, frequent Communion, active charity, love for Christ and the Church and devotion to the Blessed Virgin. Moreover, and especially, a Catholic can, and should, have certain hope for eternal salvation, which does not rest chiefly on a grace already received, but rather on prospective future forgiveness by God's omnipotence and mercy. The point in question is that however certain, the hope must retain its proper name and not be confused with faith. If together with a determination for sin, this hope is in danger of giving way to presumption.

In the Catholic tradition, a close equivalent to a doctrine of assurance has been a doctrine of final perseverance. Compliance with First Friday Devotions has sometimes been taught as a means to final perseverance.

See also
"Blessed Assurance", hymn by Fanny Crosby
Perseverance of the saints

References

Further reading

External links
 Questions of Clarification for Wesley's Doctrine of Assurance by Michael E. Lodahl
 The Relationship of Assurance to Justification and Regeneration in the Thought of John Wesley by Scott Kisker
 That We Know Him: The Doctrine of Assurance by Michael Avery (Wesleyan-Arminian)
 Sermon #10: "The Witness of the Spirit, Part 1" by John Wesley
 Sermon #11: "The Witness of the Spirit, Part 2" by John Wesley
 Sermon #12: "The Witness of Our Own Spirit" by John Wesley
 Heaven on Earth: a Treatise on Christian Assurance by Brooks, Thomas, Edinburgh: The Banner of Truth Trust, 1961. First published 1654 
 Guthrie, William (1620–1665). "The Christian's Great Interest". Retrieved 2010-07-23.
 Ryle, J.C. "Assurance". Retrieved 2010-07-23.
 Assemblies of God position on Assurance of Salvation
 Monergism.com: Directory of Theology: Assurance

Evangelical theology
Calvinist theology
Arminianism
Methodism
Lutheran theology
Christian terminology
Salvation in Protestantism